The Scottish Council of Jewish Communities (SCoJeC) is the democratic representative body of all the Jewish communities of Scotland. The Council was founded in 1999 in response to Scottish devolution, with the principal aim of providing the Jewish community of Scotland with a single voice in dealings with the Scottish Parliament and Government, other communities, and other statutory and official bodies.

The Council advances public understanding about the Jewish religion, culture and community, by providing information and assistance to educational, health, and welfare organisations. It also provides a support network for the smaller communities and individuals and families who live outside any Jewish community, and assists organisations within the Scottish Jewish community to comply with various regulatory requirements.

The Council also promotes dialogue between the Jewish community and other communities in Scotland, and works in partnership with other organisations and stakeholders to encourage understanding among community groups.

History 
The Council was formed in 1999, principally by the Glasgow Jewish Representative Council and the Edinburgh Hebrew Congregation, after Scottish Devolution to give the Jewish community of Scotland a single voice in dealings with the Scottish Parliament and Government and other official bodies.

The Council is affiliated to the Board of Deputies of British Jews, which speaks for the entire UK Jewish community on reserved matters that affect the entire UK, while the Council has the same role in relation to the Scottish Government and other Scottish bodies with regard to matters devolved by the Scotland Act that only affect Scotland. Thus the Council is autonomous with regard to matters such as justice, education, health and welfare, and community relations, whilst the Board of Deputies speaks for all Britain's Jews on reserved matters such as foreign affairs and international development.

Governance 
The Council was initially established when a meeting of all Scotland’s organised Jewish communities adopted its first constitution on 30 September 1999, and was recognised as Scottish Charity no. SC029438 by the Inland Revenue on 15 October 1999.  It was incorporated as a Scottish Charitable Incorporated Organisation on 1 December 2011.

The members of SCoJeC’s Council are the elected representatives of each of the formally organised Jewish communities in Scotland.

In addition to the elected representatives, the Council also includes up to six people who have been coopted on account of their particular expertise or experience; these have included a former judge and professor of law, a professor of social policy, a former senior civil servant, a consultant physician, and a senior social worker. The Council meets four times a year.

This representative democratic constitution enables SCoJeC to speak in the name of the whole Jewish Community of Scotland to government, parliament, churches, trades unions, the media, etc, about matters of concern to Jewish people in Scotland. For example, SCoJeC regularly responds to official consultations issued by the Scottish Government, Parliamentary Committees, and other bodies, in order to enable the views of the Scottish Jewish community to be taken into account when policy is being developed on matters that affect the community. These include antisemitism and hate crime, equalities and human rights, Family Law, death registration, the census, shechitah, medico-legal matters, protection of children and vulnerable adults, charity regulation, and other matters affecting communal organisations.

When preparing responses SCoJeC consults as appropriate with the leadership of the Scottish Orthodox, Reform, and Liberal communities, with relevant communal organisations such as Jewish Care, and with members of the community with particular expertise in the relevant area. The submitted responses then reflect the consensus or range of views expressed.

For example, SCoJeC’s response to a Scottish Government consultation about same sex marriage was prepared in consultation with all branches of Judaism represented in Scotland. The opinions were divided, with the Orthodox Jewish view very much opposed to same-sex relationships, and the Liberal Jewish community strongly supporting the proposals. SCoJeC’s response did not express a single opinion but instead set out the official positions of the various branches of the Jewish community in Scotland. Similarly, while confirming that all branches of the Jewish community in Scotland are strongly supportive of organ donation and transplantation, SCoJeC’s response to the 2018 Scottish Parliament consultation on the Organ and Tissue Donation (Scotland) Bill presented the differing views put forward by the Orthodox, Reform, and Liberal Jewish communities in Scotland.

SCoJeC only comments on matters that have an impact on the Jewish community in Scotland. For example, with regard to the Middle East, SCoJeC has stated that its role is not to express opinions about foreign affairs, or particular political issues, but when campaigning about the region sometimes becomes antisemitic rather than political, SCoJeC alerts relevant authorities to the concerns of the Scottish Jewish community.

Activities 
SCoJeC's functions generally fall into three key areas, which are reflected in its strap-line, "representing, connecting, and supporting Jewish people in Scotland":

Representation 
SCoJeC promotes the understanding of Jewish religion, culture, and community, and works to provide information and assistance to local authorities, other faith and ethnic communities, and educational, health, and welfare bodies across the country.

SCoJeC represents the Jewish community in Scotland to government and other official bodies by responding to official consultations on matters that affect the community such as antisemitism and hate crime, equalities and human rights, Family Law, registration and the census, shechitah, medico-legal matters, protection of children and vulnerable adults, charity regulation, and other matters affecting communal organisations.

ScoJeC holds regular formal and informal contacts with Ministers, Members of the Scottish Parliament (MSPs), Member of Parliament (MPs), and civil servants, and participates in various Scottish Government equality initiatives and Scottish Parliament Cross Party Groups such as those on Race and on Human Rights.

SCoJeC represents the Scottish Jewish Community on a wide range of national organisations dealing with aspects of community relations, interfaith relations, Human Rights, equality matters, etc, including, amongst others, the Boards of BEMIS (the Scottish Ethnic Minority umbrella body), Interfaith Scotland, Scottish Faiths Action for Refugees and Faith in Communities Scotland. In addition, SCoJeC is also a member of advisory bodies such as the Joint Committee on Religious and Moral Education, the Scottish Government Death Registration Advisory Group, NHS Spiritual Care Committees, Police Scotland Community Advisor groups, and the Joint Faiths Advisory Board on Criminal Justice.

SCoJeC also holds meetings with senior officers and officials of the Church of Scotland, the Roman Catholic Church in Scotland, and the STUC.

SCoJeC represents the Scottish Jewish Community is assisting the National Records of Scotland with their planning for the next census in 2021, by asking members of the Jewish Community to test different versions of questions of particular relevance, like whether to include "Jewish" as an option for the Ethnicity question. In 2018, SCoJeC collaborated with Jewish Policy Research (JPR) on data collection in 2018 for the significant study of antisemitism throughout Europe they conducted, together with Ipsos, for the EU Agency for Fundamental Rights (FRA).

SCoJeC is not a political or a religious organisation; it is the secular representative organisation of the Jewish communities in Scotland, and it responds to a wide range of issues and organisations. 

SCoJeC makes representations on behalf of the Jewish Community in Scotland to the Scottish Government, Scottish Parliamentary committees, MSPs, and other bodies on issues concerning Jews in Scotland. For example, in July 2019, SCoJeC issued a statement in July 2019 responding to the Antisemitism in the Labour Party,  calling on Scottish Labour to demonstrate leadership, support whistle blowers, and push for serious action to be taken to deal with antisemitism.

SCoJeC met First Minister Nicola Sturgeon in 2018, along with Board of Deputies President Marie van der Zyl, Board of Deputies Public Affairs Director Phil Rosenberg, and Glasgow Jewish Representative Council Co-President Evy Yedd to discuss antisemitism, Scotland's Jewish community, and the impact that attitudes to Israel have on Jewish people living in Scotland. They also represented the Scottish Jewish Community by contributing a Hebrew Prayer at the 2007 and 2011 Kirking of Scottish Parliament in the presence of the Prince of Wales and Duke of York respectively.

Connecting communities 
SCoJeC works in partnership with other organisations to develop relationships between communities.

SCoJeC is represented on the Executive of a Scottish charity specialising in facilitating constructive engagement between different faith and belief communities across Scotland.

In 2018, SCoJeC took part in a discussion and kosher lunch hosted by Rt Rev Dr Derek Browning, the Moderator of the General Assembly of the Church of Scotland at the time. The theme of the discussion was the challenges facing all people of faith in Scotland today, and how shared hospitality offers as an example of how faiths can relate to one another. In 2010, SCoJeC sponsored a Symposium jointly with the Roman Catholic Archdiocese of Glasgow, to mark the 45th anniversary of the historic Nostra aetate, the ground-breaking declaration by Pope John XXIII following the Second Vatican Council, that set the scene for a complete transformation of relations between the Catholic Church and the Jewish Community.

In 2018, SCoJeC participated in a meeting of the Cross-Party Group on Tackling Islamophobia in the Scottish Parliament to discuss Shared Experiences, Shared Challenges, and Shared Ideas alongside the Muslim Council of Scotland (MCS). The meeting concluded with the signing of a joint declaration by the representatives of SCoJeC and the MCS, stating that the organisations stand together determined to end the hatred and extremism that affect us all.

Supporting communities 
SCoJeC's work within the community aims to enable the Jewish communities in Scotland, and Jewish individuals living outwith any settled community, to connect with one another.

SCoJeC provides services to all of Scotland’s Jewish communities, for example it assists the Community to comply with Protection of Vulnerable Groups regulations by advising communal organisations about relevant requirements, and carrying out Scheme Record applications on behalf of most voluntary organisations in the Jewish community (including all communal youth groups, synagogues, and educational organisations). SCoJeC also assists the Community to comply with immigration regulations by informing communal organisations about relevant requirements, and sponsoring visa applications for overseas visitors to carry out work in the community, for example to enable a visiting rabbi to perform a wedding, or to ensure that volunteer youth workers from outwith the European Economic Area can legally participate in a communal organisation's activities.

SCoJeC responds to requests from local authorities, NHS boards, schools, local police, etc. for information about the needs of local Jewish residents, and liaises with the Community Security Trust (CST) , the Scottish Government, the Crown Office and Procurator Fiscal Service, and Police Scotland to combat antisemitism and antisemitic incidents in Scotland.

SCoJeC provides educational resources, and sending accredited volunteer ambassadors to visit schools throughout Scotland, in order to promote better understanding of Judaism and the Jewish community, and organises and supports social and educational events in the smaller communities and in remote venues such as Lochgilphead, Findhorn, Oban, Skye, Shetland, Arran, and the Borders.

SCoJeC provides a support network for the smaller Jewish communities, for individuals and families who live in rural areas and outwith any Jewish community, and for those in and around the main conurbations who have chosen not to join the formally organised communities. It also works in partnership with other Jewish community organisations in Scotland such as Jewish Student Chaplaincy Scotland, the Edinburgh Hebrew Congregation and Limmud Scotland in promoting outreach.

SCoJeC publishes a quarterly newsletter which provides information about events and activities across Scotland. SCoJeC also conducted several small-scale inquiries with funding from the Scottish Government, to find out about the variety of experience of Jewish people in Scotland, and encourage them to identify the issues that are important to them, most recently in 2020, the final report being still under works. These studies provided an opportunity for Jewish people from throughout Scotland to address some concerns about security and about their relationships with the wider community.

SCoJeC holds events throughout Scotland aimed at connecting the Jewish community. For example, it played a central role in the Jewish Gathering hosted by Edinburgh Hebrew Congregation in October 2018 in Edinburgh, a first nationwide get-together for Scottish Jews, bringing together around 160 Jewish people from all over Scotland.

Educational resources 
SCoJeC aims to increase understanding and communication around Jewish life and belief. SCoJeC offers Educational Resources such as information sessions and activities about Judaism for school and community groups. 

SCoJeC has an undergoing educational project that consists of training Jewish volunteers to deliver educational talks and activities about their faith and community to schools and other groups, and to represent the Jewish community at interfaith events. Jewish topics discussed in these sessions include Shabbat and the Jewish Festivals, Jewish Life Cycle, Synagogues, and Kosher food and other aspects of daily life.

SCoJeC also developed JOES Boxes (Jewish Objects for Education in Scotland), which were designed to  include a range of objects such as Shabbat Candlesticks, Havdalah sets, Torah scrolls or Chanukiah, to develop interest about Judaism and understanding of the Jewish way of life. As the boxes were designed to be an educational resource, they are provided to every local council in Scotland, and backed up by an additional web resource.

See also 
 History of the Jews in Scotland
Board of Deputies of British Jews
British Jews
European Jewish Congress
Institute for Jewish Policy Research
Judaism

References

External links 
 Official SCoJeC website

Jews and Judaism in Scotland
1999 establishments in Scotland
Organisations based in Glasgow
Jewish organisations based in the United Kingdom
Religious organisations based in Scotland
Jewish political organizations
Jewish organizations established in 1999